Daniel Browne (born 16 April 1979) is currently playing club rugby for London Welsh in the Aviva Championship.  He previously played for Bath, Northampton Saints and Leeds Carnegie in the English Premiership.

Browne is eligible to play for New Zealand (through birth), Ireland (Irish Father) and England (3 year residency) and Samoan Rugby Union Team (Samoan Mother). He declared in August 2010 that his preference would be to play for Ireland.

Browne's position of choice is as a number eight.

References

External links
Bath Rugby profile

Bath Rugby players
1979 births
Living people
Rugby union players from Auckland
Rugby union number eights